The 2019–20 Hong Kong Third Division League was the 6th season of Hong Kong Third Division since it became the fourth-tier football league in Hong Kong in 2014–15. The season began on 8 September 2019 and ended on 16 April 2020 when the Hong Kong Football Association announced the cancellation of all lower division seasons due to the 2020 coronavirus pandemic in Hong Kong.

Teams

Changes from last season

From Third Division

Promoted to Second Division
 Chelsea Soccer School (Hong Kong) 
 Kwai Tsing

Eliminated from league
 MLFA
 Freemen FC

To Third Division

Relegated from Second Division
 Qiyi Hanstti 
 Sun Hei

New Clubs
 Wofoo Social Enterprises
 Ravia King Mountain
 Kowloon Cricket Club
 Wing Go

Name changes
 Qiyi Hanstti renamed as Lansbury

League table

References

Hong Kong Third Division League seasons
2019–20 in Hong Kong football